Skitliv (Norwegian and Swedish for "crap life") is a Norwegian black-/doom metal band founded in 2005 by former Mayhem vocalist Maniac and Shining vocalist Niklas Kvarforth.

Maniac describes the project as "firmly rooted in black metal" but much darker and more brooding than anything he has done before.

Members 
 Sven Erik "Maniac" Kristiansen - vocals, guitar
 Niklas Kvarforth - guitar
 Dag Otto - drums
 Ingvar Magnusson - guitar

Discography 
 Kristiansen And Kvarforth Swim In The Sea Of Equalibrium While Waiting... (demo) (2007)
 Amfetamin (MCD) (2008)
 Skandinavisk misantropi (2009)

References

Norwegian doom metal musical groups
Norwegian black metal musical groups
Musical groups established in 2005
2005 establishments in Norway
Musical groups from Oslo
Season of Mist artists